Canyon Lake, sometimes referenced as Railroad Canyon Reservoir, is a reservoir created in 1928 by the construction of the Railroad Canyon Dam in Railroad Canyon or (San Jacinto Canyon) in the Temescal Mountains of southwestern Riverside County, California. It is owned and operated by the Elsinore Valley Municipal Water District.

The reservoir is supplied by storm water runoff from the San Jacinto River and Salt Creek.  Water from the reservoir feeds the Canyon Lake Water Treatment Plant, which provides approximately 10% of the domestic water supply in the Lake Elsinore and city of Canyon Lake area.

Canyon Lake has an average depth of 20 feet. Catch and release fishing is strictly enforced.

Community
The city of Canyon Lake is a gated community near the reservoir. Residents can use golf carts and boats as a means for transportation within the community. Canyon Lake holds many annual events for residents to enjoy, such as Taco Tuesday during the summer time and festivities during various holidays.
Is not open to the public you need a pass to get in

See also
List of Riverside County, California, placename etymologies#Canyon Lake
List of Riverside County, California, placename etymologies#Railroad Canyon
 List of dams and reservoirs in California

References

External links
 
 City of Canyon Lake official website

Reservoirs in Riverside County, California

San Jacinto River (California)
Temescal Mountains
1928 establishments in California